Charles  Leonard  Booth,  (7 March 1925 – 21 March 1997) was a British diplomat in the second half of the Twentieth century.

Education
Booth was educated at Heywood Grammar School and Pembroke College, Oxford.

Military service
Booth was a captain in the Royal Artillery from 1943 until 1947.

Career
Booth joined Her Majesty's Diplomatic Service in 1950. He was Third then Second Secretary in Rangoon from 1951 to 1955. He was at the Foreign Office from 1955 to 1960. He was First Secretary in Rome from 1960 to 1963; then Head of Chancery at Rangoon from 1963 to 1964, and at Bangkok from 1964 to 1967. He became a Counsellor in 1968 and after that was Deputy High Commissioner in Kampala from 1969 to 1971. He was Consul-General in Washington from 1971 to 1973; Counsellor in Belgrade from 1973 to 1977; Ambassador to Burma from 1978 to 1982; and finally, High Commissioner to Malta from 1982 to 1985.

Honours
He was awarded the honour of Officer of the Order of Merit of the Italian Republic in 1961. In that same year he was awarded the LVO. In 1979 he became a CMG.

References

Ambassadors of the United Kingdom to Myanmar
High Commissioners of the United Kingdom to Malta
People educated at Heywood Grammar School
Alumni of Pembroke College, Oxford
Officers of the Order of Merit of the Italian Republic
Lieutenants of the Royal Victorian Order
Companions of the Order of St Michael and St George
1925 births
1997 deaths
British Army personnel of World War II
Royal Artillery officers